Carletonville is a ghost town in Chippewa County, Michigan.  It was founded in 1853 by Guy H. Carleton around a sawmill but never took off and did not last long.

Sources
Walter Romig, Michigan Place Names, p. 98.

Populated places established in 1853
Former populated places in Michigan
Former populated places in Chippewa County, Michigan